Mount Seattle is a  peak in the Saint Elias Mountains of Alaska in the United States. It was named for the city of Seattle, home of the "camp hands" of a 19th-century National Geographic Society–United States Geological Survey scientific expedition to the Hubbard Glacier and Mount Saint Elias. It is called the "most prominent Alaskan coastal peak" and blocks sight of larger inland peaks, even Mount Logan nearly twice its height.

It was first ascended in May 1966 by Fred Beckey, Eric Bjornstad and four other climbers.

See also

List of mountain peaks of North America
List of mountain peaks of the United States
List of Ultras of the United States

References

Further reading

External links

North American 3000 m summits
Mountains of Alaska
Saint Elias Mountains
Wrangell–St. Elias National Park and Preserve
Seattle